Angelo Ruiz (born 5 October 1957) is a Puerto Rican judoka. He competed at the 1976 Summer Olympics and the 1988 Summer Olympics.

References

1957 births
Living people
Puerto Rican male judoka
Olympic judoka of Puerto Rico
Judoka at the 1976 Summer Olympics
Judoka at the 1988 Summer Olympics
Place of birth missing (living people)
20th-century Puerto Rican people